Sheikh Jaber Al-Mubarak Al-Hamad Al-Sabah (born 4 January 1942) is a Kuwaiti royal and former politician who served as the prime minister of Kuwait from 2011 to 2019. Previously he served as minister of defense as well as deputy prime minister. In April 2021 a Kuwaiti court ordered his detention on corruption charges.

Jaber was first appointed as prime minister on 4 December 2011. A year later, on 5 December 2012, he was reappointed as prime minister following the parliamentary election held on 1 December 2012.  He was re-appointed in the same position on 1 November 2017.

Career
Jaber began his career an advisor at the administrative affairs department in the Amiri Diwan in 1968 and served there until 1971. Then, he served as director of the administrative affairs department in the Diwan until 1975. He went on to become assistant undersecretary of administrative and financial affairs at the Diwan until 1979. In that year, he became a governor, serving from 1979 to 1985 at Hawally and from 1985 to 1986 at Ahmedy. He was minister of social and labor affairs from 1986 to 1988 and minister of information from 1988 to 1990.

After the liberation of Kuwait in 1991, Jaber became advisor to the office of the Emir, a position he held until 2001. On 14 February 2001, he was named deputy prime minister and defense minister. In 2004, Jaber became chairman of the Supreme Council of Environment. In 2006, he was appointed first deputy prime minister, as well as interior and defense minister. The following year, he was named first deputy prime minister and defense minister.

Sabah was appointed prime minister on 4 December 2011. On 5 December 2012, he was reappointed as prime minister following a parliamentary election held on 1 December 2012.

In January 2014 it was announced that he had reshuffled his five-month-old cabinet, replacing seven members, including the oil and finance ministers, and raising the number of Islamists to four. The reshuffle came two weeks after all the ministers submitted their resignations to Sabah after several cabinet members, including the prime minister himself, were questioned by MPs. Emir Sabah Al Ahmad Al Sabah accepted the resignation of seven of the 15 ministers and decreed the appointment of new ministers. The modified cabinet included a new oil minister, Ali Al Omair, a lawmaker who was a senior member of the Islamist Salaf Alliance. He replaced Mustafa Al Shamali.

Corruption charges
On April 13, 2021, a Kuwaiti court ordered the detention of Jaber Al Mubarak Al Hamad Al Sabah on corruption charges. He is the first former Kuwaiti prime minister to face pre-trial detention over graft charges. The crimes allegedly took place during Jaber Al-Sabah's 2001–11 term as defense minister.

Activities
He is a patron of the Sheikh Mubarak Al Hamad Al Sabah Journalism award, created in 2008 to honor excellence in Kuwaiti journalism.

Personal life
Jaber Al-Mubarak Al-Sabah has been married to several women. One of his sons, Ahmed, married the daughter of Ibrahim bin Muhammed Al Ghanim, a member of the Kuwaiti Al Ghanim family.

Honours 
On 20 November 2007, King Hamad bin Issa Al Khalifa awarded Jaber the "Medal of King Issa, First Class," following his visit to Bahrain where he took part in the Middle East Forum on Internal and World Security. On 5 November 2009, he became the first Arab to be awarded Japan's highest honor conferred on foreigners, Order of the Rising Sun, Grand Cordon.

References

External links
 
 Biography at Al-Diwan Al-Amiri

|-

|-

21st-century Kuwaiti politicians
1942 births
Defence ministers of Kuwait
Information ministers of Kuwait
Interior ministers of Kuwait
Labour ministers of Kuwait
Social affairs ministers of Kuwait
Grand Cordons of the Order of the Rising Sun
Jaber Al-Mubarak Al-Hamad
Living people
Prime Ministers of Kuwait
Deputy Prime Minister of Kuwait